Roderic Barrett (1920–2000) was a British painter from Colchester, England.

Life

At fifteen years old, Roderic Barrett was accepted into the Central School of Art and Design in London. He studied there until 1940, specializing in wood engraving under John Farleigh but also receiving tuition from William Roberts and Bernard Meninsky. Barrett gradually switched from engravings to oil paintings in his later life.

Barrett became a conscientious objector in World War II, and he returned to Colchester, and in 1947, began teaching part-time at the Central School. Barrett, a lifelong Socialist and pacifist, also objected to military service during the Second World War. After 21 years, he moved on to tutor at the Royal Academy School, where he remained until his retirement in 1996. Barrett was long associated with the Colchester Art Society, succeeding Cedric Morris as its president, having been a founder member in 1946, along with Henry Collins, Lett Haines, John Nash and Cedric Morris.

Works
From 1939 to 1940, Barrett began showing with the Society of Wood Engravers. From 1946, he became a regular exhibitor with the Colchester Art Society. Cecil Keeling, one of his admirers, produced an article on art publication Motif, in the spring 1961 issue. Among the illustrations were Chairs and Men, Family of Chairs, Family Bike Ride, Ass and Man and Fallen Chair, some such engraved images over the years also appearing as oils. Barrett was given his first solo show in 1948 at The Hilton Gallery, Cambridge. The paintings, drawings and engravings included work on the Don Quixote theme.

During the remaining 40 years, Barrett’s pictures were included in a number of mixed exhibitions and solo shows. His first retrospective, at The Minories, Colchester, in 1973, would be one of a series. He also became the long-serving president of the Colchester Art Society in 1982. Barrett’s pictures from 1970 were a frequent feature of the Summer Exhibition at the Royal Academy. He had begun to teach part-time in the Academy Schools. 

Since showing at the Beaux Arts gallery, London, in 1954, Barrett exhibited regularly, culminating in a show at the European parliament gallery, Strasbourg (1995), important retrospective exhibitions at the Barbican Centre and The Minories, Colchester (1996) and the Bradford Museum (2008). From 1993 to 1998, he was a trustee of the Colchester and District Visual Arts Trust; and, in 1997, was awarded an honorary doctorate by the University of Essex.

Barrett was an outspoken defender of what he called ‘authentic’ art. He was a deeply moral artist and hard work and honesty were important to him. His work is held by the Victoria & Albert Museum and many provincial galleries. Barrett’s work was well summed up by Puttfarken when he wrote, Roderic Barrett ‘… was a painter of great emotional, as well as formal, power, of rich symbolic suggestiveness and, above all, of deep humanity’.

Family
Barrett’s great-grandfather was a nonconformist radical and Chartist. His grandfather was a Liberal and Congregationalist. His father was also a Congregationalist and then a Quaker, a propagandist for the Labour Party and pacifist, an imprisoned conscientious objector during the First World War. When Barrett was only 10, his mother died and it almost certainly contributed to his later melancholic predisposition. He had three children, Jonathan, Kristin and Mark.

Comments
In the words of his biographer David Buckman, ‘Barrett was one of the most distinctive artists working in Britain in the twentieth century … he is the opposite of the commercial painter of pretty pictures that fill a gap in the sitting room wall and convey their message in a glance’. Or as his friend Thomas Puttfarken wrote ‘[Barrett was] fundamentally resistant to, and suspicious of, the “isms” of modern and post-modern art since the 1960s, Roderic pursued his own way’.

Again, in Puttfarken’s view, ‘when Barrett switched from engravings to oils, he retained the mastery and precision of drawing associated with the former. In Barrett’s work, seemingly normal objects, such as chairs, tables, buckets and candles take on symbolic meanings, suggestions of myths, the subconscious, or of nightmares. What shines through the appearance of a domestic scene are the fears and anxieties, the slender hopes and the melancholia of the human condition’.

References

1920 births
2000 deaths
20th-century British painters
British male painters
20th-century British male artists